Miguel Aarón López Hernández (born November 9, 1988) is an American luchador enmascarado, or masked professional wrestler, best known under the name El Hijo de Rey Misterio. His ring name is Spanish for "The Son of the Mystery King". He is the first-born son of the luchador Rey Misterio Sr. He is also the cousin of Rey Mysterio. He mainly works on the independent circuit in the United States, especially in California and in Mexico, especially in Tijuana, Baja California.

Professional wrestling career
El Hijo de Rey Misterio grew up in a wrestling family with both his father, Miguel Ángel López Díaz who wrestles as Rey Misterio Sr., and his cousin, Óscar Gutiérrez, better known as Rey Mysterio, being very well known luchadors. At the age of 13 he began training with his father at his wrestling school in Tijuana. He made his professional wrestling debut in 2006, initially working under the ring name Diablo. By the end of 2006 his father gave him permission to use the "Rey Misterio" name and he became "El Hijo de Rey Misterio". The name has led to some confusion, especially when wrestling in the United States where a lot of fans have mistaken him for the son of Rey Mysterio, but Mysterio is actually his cousin. Some promoters have actively sought to exploit this confusion by neglecting to bill him as "El Hijo de" and just billed him as Rey Misterio. In one controversial case a Bolivian promoter used World Wrestling Entertainment footage of Rey Mysterio to promote a tour by El Hijo de Rey Misterio, when Hijo de Rey Misterio found out he cancelled his tour. When El Hijo de Rey Misterio cancelled his tour the Bolivian promoter had someone else wrestle under the mask, pretending to be El Hijo de Rey Misterio.

Since adopting the "Hijo de Rey Misterio" name he has been working mainly for Pro Wrestling Revolution (PWR) in Northern California, shows in Tijuana and made various independent wrestling promotion appearances in America. His stint in PWR saw him team with his father on several occasions, the two won a tournament to become the first PWR Tag Team Champions when they defeated the Border Patrol (Oliver John and Nathan Rulez) on May 31, 2008. The duo defended the title a couple of times during 2008 but were forced to vacate the title in June, 2009 as Rey Misterio, Sr. suffered a serious injury. He has stated that while he likes working in the United States he really wants to focus on a wrestling career in Mexico, hoping to work for Consejo Mundial de Lucha Libre (CMLL) Lucha Libre AAA Worldwide (AAA), Mexico's two largest professional wrestling promotions. In October 2009 it was reported that El Hijo de Rey Misterio had been working at CMLL's wrestling school in Mexico City, Mexico to train for his future CMLL debut. He would, however, never make an appearance for CMLL, before suddenly announcing his retirement from professional wrestling in early 2011. On May 27, 2011, a new El Hijo de Rey Misterio was introduced by Rey Misterio, Sr. and Konnan, making his debut in Tijuana. He now goes by Rey Horus. The original El Hijo de Rey Misterio returned to professional wrestling in November 2011. On December 25, 2011, he defeated Mortiz and Mr. Tempest in a ladder match to win the Baja California Championship, joining Los Perros del Mal in the process.

Personal life
El Hijo de Rey Misterio is part of an extended family of wrestlers, his father Miguel Ángel López Díaz is best known under the ring name Rey Misterio (Sr.), his cousin Oscar Gutiérrez, works for World Wrestling Entertainment as Rey Mysterio. His other cousin is a wrestler known as Metalika and his uncle, Juan Zezatti Ramírez, is better known as Super Astro. 

In May 2012 López and his younger brother were arrested in Playas de Rosarito, Baja California, with a kilogram of the drug "ice" in their possession. Both were turned over to the federal authorities for prosecution. It was never reported if López was ever convicted of any crime.

Championships and accomplishments
Pro Wrestling Revolution
Pro Wrestling Revolution Tag Team Championship (1 time) - with Rey Misterio, Sr.
Vendetta Pro Wrestling
Vendetta Pro Wrestling Heavyweight Championship (1 time)
Other titles
Baja California Championship (1 time, current)

Luchas de Apuestas record

References

External links
 Profile at Luchawiki.com

1989 births
Living people
Mexican male professional wrestlers
American male professional wrestlers
Sportspeople from San Diego
Professional wrestlers from California